Albert Dolhats (18 February 1921 – 25 November 2009) was a French racing cyclist. He rode in the 1949 Tour de France.

References

External links
 

1921 births
2009 deaths
French male cyclists
Sportspeople from Pyrénées-Atlantiques
Cyclists from Nouvelle-Aquitaine